Work is a 2010 album by Swedish indie rock band Shout Out Louds. It was released in the United States and Canada on 23 February 2010, in Scandinavia on 24 February 2010 and in Germany, Australia, Switzerland, and Austria on 26 February 2010. The album was preceded by 2007's Our Ill Wills. The first single off of Work was "Walls", which was released as a free MP3 download through the band's website. The second single, "Fall Hard", was made available as free streaming audio on the band's MySpace website over a month before the album's release.

Work is the band's third full-length release. It was produced by Phil Ek, the producer of Fleet Foxes' eponymous debut album, Band of Horses' Cease to Begin, and The Shins' Chutes Too Narrow and Wincing the Night Away. Merge Records, the label on which the album is being distributed in North America, describes the album as "strip[ping] away the bells and whistles of previous efforts".

Critical reception 

Upon its release, Work received mixed reviews, with some commentators criticizing it as "bland" and "risk-averse" and others praising it for having "a distinct sound and identity" and "great energy".

Track listing

Chart positions

References 

2010 albums
Shout Out Louds albums
Merge Records albums
Vertigo Records albums
Albums produced by Phil Ek
Albums recorded at Bear Creek Studio